Genoplesium psammophilum is a species of small terrestrial orchid endemic to coastal and near-coastal areas in south-eastern Queensland. It has a single thin leaf fused to the flowering stem and up to thirty five small, dark red or brownish red flowers. The species is treated as Corunastylis psammophila in Queensland.

Description
As with others in the genus, the flowers are inverted so that the labellum is above the column rather than below it. There is a small, white gland on the tip of the lateral sepals. There is a reddish to reddish black callus in the centre of the labellum and covering about half of its surface. Flowering occurs from March to May.

Taxonomy and naming
Genoplesium psammophilum was first formally described in 1991 by David Jones from a specimen collected near Amity and the description was published in Australian Orchid Research. In 2002, David Jones and Mark Clements changed the name to Corunastylis psammophila and the species is known by that name in Queensland, but the name is not accepted by the Australian Plant Census. The specific epithet (psammophila) is derived from the Ancient Greek words ψάμμος (psámmos), meaning “sand” and φίλος (phílos), meaning “dear one" or "friend”, referring to the soil type in which this species is found.

Distribution and habitat
Genoplesium psammophilum grows in coastal and near-coastal heath and wallum in south-eastern Queensland.

References

psammophilum
Endemic orchids of Australia
Orchids of Queensland
Plants described in 1991